Tony Zummack (born ) is a Scottish and British curler and curling coach.

Record as a coach of national teams

References

External links

Video:  (ParalympicsGB)

Living people
1967 births
Scottish male curlers
Scottish curling coaches
Place of birth missing (living people)